Chitrabon Hazarika (Assamese: চিত্ৰবন হাজৰিকা) is the Finance Secretary of the banned group ULFA, Assam. He has also been holding the additional charge of general secretary since Anup Chetia’s arrest in 1997. A commerce graduate he hails from Jakhalabandha in Nagaon district of Assam. He is married to Pranati Deka, the arrested Cultural Secretary of the group.

Arrest
On Sunday night, November 1, 2009, some unidentified gunman took Hazarika, along with the group’s foreign secretary Sashadhar Choudhury away from a house in sector 3 of Uttara in Dhaka. Later they were pushed back to the Indo-Bangladesh Border where they were detained by BSF in Tripura while trying to infiltrate on the night of November 4. They were handed over to Assam Police on November 6 by the BSF. But according to the Assam Police, the leaders surrendered before BSF in Tripura fleeing the crackdown against them in Bangladesh.

On Saturday, November 7, 2009, the Special Operation Unit of the Assam police produced Choudhury and Hazarika before the court of Chief Judicial Magistrate, Kamrup (Metropolitan).

Reaction
On November 9, 2009 ULFA called for a 12-hour Assam bandh from 6 am demanding their unconditional release. ULFA chairman Arabinda Rajkhowa, in a statement issued through e-mail, described the two leaders’ arrest as a “ploy to sabotage the process of finding a political solution to the problem and destroy ULFA militarily.”

See also
List of top leaders of ULFA
Sanjukta Mukti Fouj
People's Consultative Group

References

People from Nagaon district
ULFA members
Living people
Prisoners and detainees from Assam
Year of birth missing (living people)